Ctenane is a genus of moths of the family Nolidae described by Swinhoe in 1905. The genus was previously included in the subfamily Lithosiinae.

Species
Ctenane dealbata (Wileman & West) 
Ctenane labuana (Swinhoe, 1904) Assam, China (Hainan), Sumatra, Borneo, Philippines
Ctenane michaeli László, Ronkay & Ronkay, 2015 Sumatra
Ctenane trianguloquelinea (van Eecke, 1920) Java, Sumatra, Borneo, northern Thailand
Ctenane yanguinghui (László, Ronkay & Ronkay, 2014) Taiwan

References

External links

Nolidae